Kenneth, Kenny, or Ken Smith may refer to:

Sports

Footballers
Ken Smith (footballer, born 1927), English footballer who played as an inside forward
Ken Smith (footballer, born 1932) (1932–2011), English footballer who played as a centre forward
Kenny Smith (AFL player) in 2007 Austin Wranglers season

Racing
Ken Smith (racing driver) (born 1942), New Zealand motor racing driver
Ken Smith (racer) in New England Auto Racers Hall of Fame
Ken Smith (speedway rider) from Grasstrack

American football
Kenny Smith (American football) (born 1977), American football player
Ken Smith (American football), played in List of Boston College Eagles starting quarterbacks

Baseball
Kenneth Smith (baseball), played Baseball at the 1956 Summer Olympics
Ken Smith (baseball) (born 1958), former Major League Baseball player

Basketball
Speedy Smith (born 1993), American college basketball player for the Louisiana Tech Bulldogs
Ken Smith (basketball, born 1953), American professional basketball player for the San Antonio Spurs
Ken Smith (basketball, born 1954), American college basketball coach for the Northern Colorado Bears 
Kenny Smith (born 1965), American basketball player and announcer

Other sports
Kenny Smith (ice hockey) (1924–2000), ice hockey player
Ken Smith (rugby union) (born 1931), Scottish international rugby player
Kenny Smith (rugby union), Irish rugby union player
Kenneth Smith (cricketer) (1922–1998), English cricketer
Ken Smith (sportswriter), American sportswriter
Kenneth Smith (sailor), competed in 1960 Star World Championships
Kenneth Smith (swimmer), competed in 2006 FINA World Open Water Swimming Championships – Men's 10K

Politicians
Ken Smith (Australian politician) (born 1944), Australian member of the Victorian Legislative Assembly
Ken Smith (American politician) (born 1926), American former politician in the state of Florida
Kenneth J. Smith, Pennsylvania politician
Kenneth Smith (mayor), Mayor of Bethlehem, Pennsylvania from 1988 to 1997

Music
Ken Smith (songwriter), The Vagabond Lover
Kenneth Smith (singer) on "Walking in the Air"
Kenny Smith (bluegrass) of the Kenny & Amanda Smith Band

Others
Kenneth Smith (British Army soldier) (1920–1945), recipient of the George Cross
Kenneth B. Smith (1931–2008), Chicago-area community leader and minister
Ken Smith (architect) (born 1953), American architect
Ken Smith (chess player) (1930–1999), American chess player and author
Ken Smith (poet) (1938–2003), British poet
Ken Smith (Home and Away), character on the Australian soap opera Home and Away
Kenneth C. Smith (born 1932), Canadian electrical engineering professor
Kenneth F. Smith, special effects artist
Kenneth L. Smith, civil engineer for the National Park Service
Kenneth Smith (author) from The Comics Journal

See also
Kenneth Smyth (disambiguation)